Fazilatun Nessa Indira is a Bangladesh Awami League politician and the incumbent State Minister of Women and Children Affairs. She was selected as a member of parliament from reserved seats of women consecutively in the 9th, 10th and 11th parliamentary elections.

Career
Indira was elected as the general secretary of Mohila Awami League through council election of 2003. She was elected as the women affairs secretary of Bangladesh Awami League in the triennial council in October 2016.

References

Living people
Awami League politicians
Women members of the Jatiya Sangsad
Women government ministers of Bangladesh
State Ministers of Women and Children Affairs (Bangladesh)
9th Jatiya Sangsad members
10th Jatiya Sangsad members
11th Jatiya Sangsad members
Place of birth missing (living people)
Date of birth missing (living people)
Year of birth missing (living people)
21st-century Bangladeshi women politicians